Antiponemertes is a genus of nemertean worms that contains the following species:

 Antiponemertes allisonae (Moore, 1973)
 Antiponemertes novaezealandiae (Dendy, 1895)
 Antiponemertes pantini (Southgate, 1954)

References 

Prosorhochmidae
Nemertea genera